Damn! is a 1996 album by the American jazz organist Jimmy Smith. The album was Smith's first album for Verve Records for over twenty years.

Damn! peaked at number 13 on the Billboard Top Jazz Album charts.

It's the last recording session of the drummer Art Taylor, a few weeks before his death.

Reception

The AllMusic review by Steve Leggett awarded the album four stars with Leggett writing that "The whole album, start to finish, works a wonderful groove, but versions here of James Brown's "Papa's Got a Brand New Bag," Herbie Hancock's "Watermelon Man," and Charlie Parker's "Scrapple from the Apple" are particularly strong..Damn! is right up there with his best work, full of a joyous energy, and it sparked a resurgence of sorts for Smith."

Track listing
 "Papa's Got a Brand New Bag" (James Brown) – 7:30	
 "Sister Sadie" (Horace Silver) – 6:57
 "Woody 'n' You" (Dizzy Gillespie) – 6:50
 "The One Before This" (Gene Ammons) – 6:53
 "Watermelon Man" (Herbie Hancock) – 8:43
 "Dat Dere" (Bobby Timmons) – 7:30
 "Scrapple from the Apple" (Charlie Parker) – 5:25
 "Hi-Fly" (Randy Weston) – 6:35
 "A L Mode" (Curtis Fuller) – 6:25

Personnel 
Musicians
 Jimmy Smith – organ, arranger
 Roy Hargrove – flugelhorn, trumpet
 Nicholas Payton – trumpet
 Bernard "Pretty" Purdie - drums
 Abraham Burton – alto saxophone

 Mark Turner– tenor saxophone (track 2)
 Tim Warfield– tenor saxophone (tracks 2, 4, 5, 9)
 Ron Blake – tenor saxophone (tracks 4, 5, 9),
 Mark Whitfield – guitar
 Christian McBride – double bass
 Art Taylor – drums

Production
 Jim Anderson – engineer, mixing
 Lola Smith – executive producer
 Allan Tucker – mastering
 Chris Albert – mixing assistant
 Jimmy Katz – photography
 Camille Tominaro – production coordination
 David Lau – art direction, design
 Rudi Mallasch – assistant coordinator
 Scott Austin – assistant engineer
 Nate Herr – coordination
 Richard Seidel – producer
 Don Sickler

References

1995 albums
Jimmy Smith (musician) albums
Verve Records albums